Milne's High School is  a secondary school in Fochabers, Moray, Scotland.

The school's feeder primaries are Milne's Primary School, Lhanbryde Primary School and Mosstodloch Primary School and it is divided into three houses: Spey 1, Spey 2, Tynet 1 and Tynet 2

In 2014, an education review suggested that Milne's be closed and its pupils attend neighbouring schools. A final decision was made in November 2014 guaranteeing it would be kept open.

During the COVID-19 pandemic (2020 - 2022+) the school faced multiple Head teacher changes including Mrs T Cameron to Mrs C Boyle and Mrs C Boyle to Miss J Playfair (2022).

References

External links 
 

Secondary schools in Moray